Nagarpur Union is a town governed by a union council, located in Nagarpur Upazila, Tangail District, Bangladesh. It is situated 24 km south of Tangail city.

Demographics

According to Population Census 2011 performed by Bangladesh Bureau of Statistics, The total population of Nagarpur union is 27,038. There are 6,303 households in total.

Education

The literacy rate of Nagarpur Union is 48% (Male-52.1%, Female-44.2%).

See also
 Union Councils of Tangail District

References

Populated places in Dhaka Division
Populated places in Tangail District
Unions of Nagarpur Upazila